Rafael Zepeda Martínez (born August 22, 1961 in Mexico City) is a Mexican long-distance runner.
Certificate in Neuromuscular Bandage, Functional Bandage and Flossband by the Alcalá Institute of Sciences and Specialties of Health, Mexico.
He holds a degree in Physical Education, and a Sports Sciences Diploma, Master's degree in Psychology from UNITEC
He is a certified trainer by FMAA (Federación Mexicana de Asociaciones de Atletismo)
Elite Athlete.

Major competition record

References

1961 births
Mexican male long-distance runners
Athletes from Mexico City
Living people
Competitors at the 1990 Goodwill Games
20th-century Mexican people